Brent is a census-designated place (CDP) in Escambia County, Florida, United States.  The population was 21,804 at the 2010 census. It is a principal city of the Pensacola-Ferry Pass-Brent Metropolitan Statistical Area. The community is named after Francis Celestino Brent, who played an integral role in the development of Pensacola.

Geography

The boundaries of the CDP include Fairfield Drive to the south, the city of Pensacola to the west, Interstate 10 (Ensley) to the north, and Bellview to the east.

Demographics

As of the census of 2000, there were 22,257 people, 7,008 households, and 4,800 families residing in the CDP. The racial makeup of the CDP was 32.25% White, 59.87% African American, 0.74% Native American, 2.28% Asian, 0.27% Pacific Islander, 0.47% from other races, and 2.13% from two or more races. Hispanic or Latino of any race were 1.95% of the population.

There were 7,008 households, out of which 32.9% had children under the age of 18 living with them, 41.7% were married couples living together, 22.1% had a female householder with no husband present, and 31.5% were non-families. 25.3% of all households were made up of individuals, and 8.7% had someone living alone who was 65 years of age or older.  The average household size was 2.60 and the average family size was 3.12.

In the CDP, the population was spread out, with 23.8% under the age of 18, 24.1% from 18 to 24, 23.4% from 25 to 44, 17.2% from 45 to 64, and 11.4% who were 65 years of age or older.  The median age was 27 years. For every 100 males, there were 84.1 females.  For every 100 males age 18 and over, there were 78.9 females.

The median income for a household in the CDP was $27,488, and the median income for a family was $31,250. Males had a median income of $26,390 versus $18,637 for females. The per capita income for the CDP was $11,774.  About 20.5% of families and 24.5% of the population were below the poverty line, including 37.9% of those under age 18 and 12.8% of those age 65 or over.

Education
Brent is part of the Escambia County School District, which also serves the entire county.

See also
Brownsville-Brent-Goulding, Florida, a single census area recorded during the 1950 Census

References

Pensacola metropolitan area
Census-designated places in Escambia County, Florida
Census-designated places in Florida